Haplopomidae is a family of bryozoans belonging to the order Cheilostomatida.

Genera:
 Haplopoma Levinsen, 1909

References

Bryozoan families